The 2015 IHF World Women's Handball Championship, the 22nd event hosted by the International Handball Federation, was held in Denmark. The decision to select Denmark as the host was announced on 27 January 2011.

In the final Norway won 31–23 against the Netherlands to gain their third title. Romania won bronze after they defeated Poland 31–22.

Venues
Venues for the tournament were announced on 7 June 2014. Jyske Bank Boxen in Herning hosted the final, both semi-finals, two quarter-finals, matches in the round of 16 and Denmark's group. SYDBANK Arena in Kolding was the venue of two quarter-finals, eighth-finals and neighbour Germany's group, while Arena Nord in Frederikshavn and the new venue in Næstved hosted one eighth-final and one group each.

Qualification

Final qualification tournament
A final qualification tournament was held from 15 to 17 June 2015 in Almaty, Kazakhstan to determine the last participant. The schedule was revealed on 3 June 2015.

Standings

Results

Qualified teams

1 Bold indicates champion for that year, Italics indicates host for that year.

Squads

Referees
17 referee pairs were selected:

Draw
The draw was held on 24 June 2015 at Koldinghus in Kolding, Denmark at 20:00 local time.

Seeding
The seeding was announced on 23 June 2015.

Preliminary round
All times are local (UTC+1).

Group A

Group B

Group C

Group D

President's Cup

17–20th place playoff

17–20th place semifinals

19th place game

17th place game

21st–24th place playoff

21st–24th place semifinals

23rd place game

21st place game

Knockout stage

Bracket

5th place bracket

Round of 16

Quarterfinals

5–8th place semifinals

Semifinals

Seventh place game

Fifth place game

Third place game

Final

Statistics

Final ranking
Places 9–16 were ranked according to their preliminary round results against teams that advanced to the round of 16.

{| class="wikitable" 
!width=40|Rank
!width=180|Team
|-bgcolor=ccffcc
|align=center||| 
|-bgcolor=ccccff
|align=center||| 
|-bgcolor=ccccff
|align=center||| 
|-bgcolor=ccccff
|align=center|4|| 
|-bgcolor=ccccff
|align=center|5|| 
|-bgcolor=ccccff
|align=center|6|| 
|-bgcolor=ccccff
|align=center|7|| 
|-
|align=center|8|| 
|-
|align=center|9|| 
|-
|align=center|10|| 
|-
|align=center|11|| 
|-
|align=center|12|| 
|-
|align=center|13|| 
|-
|align=center|14|| 
|-
|align=center|15|| 
|-
|align=center|16|| 
|-
|align=center|17|| 
|-
|align=center|18|| 
|-
|align=center|19|| 
|-
|align=center|20|| 
|-
|align=center|21|| 
|-
|align=center|22|| 
|-
|align=center|23|| 
|-
|align=center|24|| 
|}

</onlyinclude>

All Star Team

Chosen by team officials and IHF experts.

Top goalscorers

Source: IHF.info

Top goalkeepers

Source: IHF.info

References

External links
Official website
IHF website

2015 Women
World Women's Handball Championship
2015 World Women's Handball Championship
Women's handball in Denmark
World Women's Handball Championship
December 2015 sports events in Europe
Frederikshavn
Næstved Municipality
Sport in Herning
Kolding